This article provides details of international football games played by the Bosnia and Herzegovina national football team from 2020 to present.

For results prior to 2020, see Bosnia and Herzegovina national football team results (1995–2019).

Results

2020

2021

2022

Forthcoming fixtures
The following matches are scheduled:

2023

Notes

References

Football in Bosnia and Herzegovina
Bosnia and Herzegovina national football team results
2020s in Bosnia and Herzegovina sport